Burns High School is a public high school in Burns, Oregon. A part of Harney County School District 3, it serves Burns and Hines.

Academics 
In 1987 and 1991, Burns High School was honored in the Blue Ribbon Schools Program, the highest honor a school can receive in the United States.

In 2008, 82% of the school's seniors received their high school diploma. Of 77 students, 63 graduated, 3 dropped out, 6 received a modified diploma, and 5 are still in high school.

The Burns Alternative School is part of Burns High School.

Notable alumni 
 Kellen Clemens, NFL football player
 Norma Paulus, Oregon politician and lawyer
 Gene Timms, member of the Oregon State Senate

References 

High schools in Harney County, Oregon
Burns, Oregon
Public high schools in Oregon